The men's aerials competition of the FIS Freestyle World Ski Championships 2011 was held at Deer Valley, United States on February 4, 2011 (qualifications and finals).

Qualification
The following are the results of the qualification.

Final
The following are the results of the final.

References

Aerials, men's